The 1988 New South Wales Open was a tennis tournament played on grass courts at the NSW Tennis Centre in Sydney in Australia that was part of the 1988 Nabisco Grand Prix and of Tier IV of the 1988 WTA Tour. The tournament ran from 4 January through 11 January 1988.

Finals

Men's singles
 John Fitzgerald defeated  Andrei Chesnokov 6–3, 6–4
 It was Fitzgerald's 1st title of the year and the 18th of his career.

Women's singles
 Pam Shriver defeated  Helena Suková 6–2, 6–3
 It was Shriver's 3rd title of the year and the 106th of her career.

Men's doubles
 Darren Cahill /  Mark Kratzmann defeated  Joey Rive /  Bud Schultz 7–6, 6–4
 It was Cahill's 2nd title of the year and the 4th of his career. It was Kratzmann's 2nd title of the year and the 5th of his career.

Women's doubles

 Ann Henricksson /  Christiane Jolissaint defeated  Claudia Kohde-Kilsch /  Helena Suková 7–6, 4–6, 6–3
 It was Henricksson's 1st title of the year and the 1st of her career. It was Jolissaint's 1st title of the year and the 4th of her career.

External links
 Official website
 ATP tournament profile
 WTA tournament profile